Karbasan is a belde (town) in Karahallı district of Uşak Province, Turkey. At   it is situated to the southeast of karahallı. The population of Karbasan is 1383  as of 2011. According to mayor's page the Karbasan was founded about seven centuries ago by a certain Garip Hasan and was named after him. In popular speech, the name Gariphasan was converted to Karbasan. During the last years of the Ottoman Empire the medrese (Islamic school)  in Karbasan was locally well known. In 1992, it was declared a seat of township.

References

Populated places in Uşak Province
Towns in Turkey
Karahallı District